The Eastern Buckeye Conference is an OHSAA athletic league that began competition in the 2018–19 school year.  The following are members:

Members

League history
The idea for the Eastern Buckeye Conference began in December 2015 when seven of the eight Northeastern Buckeye Conference members (Alliance, Canton South, Carrollton, Marlington, Minverva, Salem, and West Branch) came together to discuss creating a new league that didn't include Louisville.  Three other schools were also included in the discussions: South Range, Crestview, and Beaver Local.

On February 4, 2016, the Northeastern Buckeye Conference voted to disband, and all conference members except for Louisville agreed to form a new league.  On June 1, 2016, WKBN-TV 27 Youngstown reported that Alliance, Canton South, Carrollton, Marlington, Minerva, Salem and West Branch would form the Eastern Buckeye Conference for the 2018-2019 school year.  South Range was initially on board to join as the eighth member of the league, but announced near the end of the 2016–17 school year that it would join the new Northeast 8 Athletic Conference for 2018–19.

In July 2020, Canton South announced that they had accepted an invitation to the Principals Athletic Conference and would be joining that league in 2022.

References

Sports organizations established in 2018
Ohio high school sports conferences
2018 establishments in Ohio